Sericoderus is a genus of minute hooded beetles in the family Corylophidae. There are about 12 described species in Sericoderus.

Species
These 12 species belong to the genus Sericoderus:

 Anisomeristes castaneus (Reitter, 1877)
 Sericoderus basalis Sharp in Blackburn & Sharp, 1885
 Sericoderus brevicornis Matthews, 1890
 Sericoderus debilis Casey, 1900
 Sericoderus flavidus LeConte, 1852
 Sericoderus lateralis (Gyllenhal, 1827)
 Sericoderus minutus Matthews, 1894
 Sericoderus obscurus LeConte, 1852
 Sericoderus pecirkanus Reitter, 1908
 Sericoderus pubipennis Sharp in Blackburn & Sharp, 1885
 Sericoderus quadratus Casey, 1900
 Sericoderus subtilis LeConte, 1852

References

Further reading

External links

 

Corylophidae
Articles created by Qbugbot
Coccinelloidea genera